Sirisak Yodyardthai is a Thai football manager who last managed Thai Honda in the Thai League 1 and sometimes coached their youth sides. He is currently the manager of Pattaya Dolphins United.

Early life

When he was 15, Sirisak was given the chance to play with his football idol, which made him want to pursue a football career. Besides playing football, he also enjoyed running in torrid weather with his brother.

Career

Under his tutelage, Thai Honda were promoted to the Thai League 1 for the 2017 season. The  Bangkok University graduate believes that players should not undertake vigorous physical activity before a game as it will exhaust rather than energize the player.

He led his team to their first top-flight victory in 10 years when they beat Bangkok United 1–0.

Before he became coach of  Thai Honda, he did multiple jobs for them including carrying their equipment, preparing food and even being a van driver for the club. Also, he has been an assistant coach for 17 years.  In 2016, he replaced Takami Masami as coach.

His sacking as coach  was  announced in April 2017 after a 3–1 defeat to Chonburi. with 3 wins and 8 losses.

Managerial statistics
.

Honours
Thai Honda FC
Thai Division 1 League: 2016

Awards

For his efforts in taking Thai Honda FC to the Thai League 1 in 2016, he received an award for the best professional sports coach.

Personal life

Sirisak has a brother and a sister. Now, he has two sons.

References

External  links
  Soccerway Profile

Sirisak Yodyardthai
Sirisak Yodyardthai
Sirisak Yodyardthai
Sirisak Yodyardthai
Living people
Sirisak Yodyardthai
Association football wingers
2019 AFC Asian Cup managers
Sirisak Yodyardthai
1969 births